Troy Mills is an unincorporated community in northern Linn County, Iowa, United States. It lies along local roads north of the city of Cedar Rapids, the county seat of Linn County. Its elevation is 869 feet (265 m). Although Troy Mills is unincorporated, it has a post office, with the ZIP code of 52344, which opened on 10 June 1867, and a full volunteer fire department.

History
Troy Mills was laid out in 1870. A gristmill and sawmill had existed there previously. Troy Mills' population was 109 in 1902.

Education
The North Linn Community School District operates area public schools.

References

Unincorporated communities in Linn County, Iowa
Unincorporated communities in Iowa
1870 establishments in Iowa
Populated places established in 1870